Peter Flippant (born 1962) is a male retired British sport shooter.

Sport shooting career
He represented England in the centre fire pistol, at the 1998 Commonwealth Games in Kuala Lumpur, Malaysia. Four years later he made a second Games appearance at the 2002 Commonwealth Games in Manchester. A third Games appearance in 2006 resulted in winning a silver medal in the centre fire pistol pair with Simon Lucas.

References

1962 births
Living people
British male sport shooters
Commonwealth Games medallists in shooting
Commonwealth Games silver medallists for England
Shooters at the 1998 Commonwealth Games
Shooters at the 2002 Commonwealth Games
Shooters at the 2006 Commonwealth Games
Medallists at the 2006 Commonwealth Games